The Tianshui South railway station is a railway station of Xi'an–Baoji High-Speed Railway in Gansu, China. It started operations on 9 July 2017. The other station in the area is Tianshui railway station. An interchange with the Tianshui Tram is planned.

Railway stations in Gansu
Stations on the Xuzhou–Lanzhou High-Speed Railway
Railway stations in China opened in 2017